Earthshaker is the third studio album by American heavy metal band Y&T, released in 1981. It is their first album under the name Y&T, after shortening it from Yesterday and Today, and their first album with  A&M Records. A mix of hard rock and heavy metal songs, AllMusic's Eduardo Rivadavia named this album as the best release in the band's career, the album most faithfully representing "the power and energy" of Y&T's "legendary concerts".

The album was re-released in 2006. Contrary to popular belief, the Japanese heavy metal band Earthshaker did not take their name from this album, rather they took it from the song "Earthshaker" off of Y&T's first album Yesterday and Today.

Track listing

Personnel
Dave Meniketti – electric guitar, lead vocals (all except track 4)
Joey Alves – electric and acoustic guitars, backing vocals
Phil Kennemore – bass, backing and lead vocals (track 4) 
Leonard Haze – drums, backing vocals

Production
Bob Shulman, David Sieff, Y&T – producers
Harvey Goldberg, Greg Mann – mixing at Mediasound Studios, New York City
Chuck Beeson – art Direction
Norman Moore – design Concept

References

Y&T albums
A&M Records albums
1981 debut albums